Shuangjiang Town is a town in Changsha County, Changsha, Hunan Province, China. It administers 10 villages and one community. Shuangjiang town merged to Jinjing town on November 19, 2015.

References

Changsha County
Changsha County